Bobby Kamwa (born 18 March 2000) is a Cameroonian professional footballer who plays for Burton Albion as a forward.

Club career

Leeds United
A product of the Leeds United Academy, Kamwa signed a two year contract in July 2020 with the club. Kamwa was released by Leeds at the end of the 2021–22 season.

Dunfermline Athletic
In January 2022 Kamwa joined Scottish Championship club Dunfermline Athletic on loan for the remainder of the 2021–22 season.

Burton Albion
He signed for League One club Burton Albion in October 2022 on a short term deal, and has now signed a new deal running until Summer 2024.

External links

References

2000 births
Living people
Footballers from Douala
Association football midfielders
Leeds United F.C. players
Dunfermline Athletic F.C. players
Burton Albion F.C. players
Scottish Professional Football League players
Cameroonian expatriate footballers
Cameroonian expatriates in England
Expatriate footballers in England
Cameroonian expatriates in Scotland
Expatriate footballers in Scotland